Cemâl Süreya (born Cemâlettin Seber; 1931 – 9 January 1990) was a Turkish poet and writer of Kurdish–Zaza descent.

Biography
Süreya and his family were deported to Bilecik, a city in the Marmara Region of Turkey after the Dersim Rebellion (Tunceli) in 1938.

He graduated from the Political Sciences Faculty of Ankara University. He was the editor-in-chief of the Papirüs literary magazine. Cemal Süreya is a notable member of the Second New Generation of Turkish poetry, an abstract and postmodern movement created as a backlash against the more popular-based Garip movement. Love, mainly through its erotic character, is a popular theme of Süreya's works. Süreya's poems and articles were published in magazines such as Yeditepe, Yazko, Pazar Postası, Yeni Ulus, Oluşum, Türkiye Yazıları, Politika, Aydınlık, and Somut. He is known to have been a primary influence on the poetry of Sunay Akın. He lost a letter "y" from his pen name – originally Süreyya – because of a lost bet with Turkish poet Sezai Karakoç.

Bibliography

Poetry
Üvercinka (1958)
Göçebe (1965)
Beni Öp Sonra Doğur Beni (1973)
Sevda Sözleri (Terms of Endearment, 1984)
Güz Bitiği (1988)
Sıcak Nal (1988)
Sevda Sözleri (1990)

Articles
Şapkam Dolu Çiçekle (1976)
Günübirlik (1982)
Onüç Günün Mektupları (1990)
99 Yüz (1990)
Günler (1991)
Aydınlık Yazıları/Paçal (1992)
Oluşum'da Cemal Süreya (1992)
Folklor Şiire Düşman (1992)
Papirüs'ten Başyazılar (1992)
Uzat Saçlarını Frigya (1992)
Aritmetik iyi Kuşlar Pekiyi (1993) – for children

See also
 List of contemporary Turkish poets

References
Notes

Bibliography
 Siirgen.org – Biography and bibliography of Cemal Süreya 

1931 births
1990 deaths
People from Erzincan
Turkish people of Kurdish descent
Zaza_people
Turkish-language writers
Turkish erotic artists
Ankara University Faculty of Political Sciences alumni